Same-sex marriage has been legal in Coahuila since 17 September 2014, the effective date of legislation passed on 1 September 2014. Prior to the law's passage, civil unions for same-sex couples were legal, but not same-sex marriage. The passage of the same-sex marriage bill made Coahuila the second jurisdiction in Mexico, and the first state (as Mexico City is not a state), to pass same-sex marriage via legislative means. Only Mexico City and the state of Quintana Roo allowed for same-sex marriage prior to Coahuila.

Civil unions
Discussion on the legalization of same-sex civil unions in Coahuila started as early as November 2006, simultaneously with the discussion then ongoing in Mexico City. On 11 January 2007, in a 20–13 vote, the Congress of Coahuila voted to legalize same-sex civil unions under the name  (PCS), which gave property and inheritance rights to same-sex couples; similar to France's civil solidarity pact and Germany's registered life partnership. This made Coahuila the second jurisdiction in Mexico after Mexico City to recognize same-sex unions.

"The PCS represented a sensible response to the existence of citizens who traditionally have been victims of discrimination, humiliation and abuse. This does not have to do with morality. It has to do with legality. As human beings, we have to protect them as they are. It has to do with civil liberty," said Congresswoman Julieta López Fuentes from the centrist Institutional Revolutionary Party (PRI), whose members voted for the law. Deputy Luis Alberto Mendoza, of the center-right National Action Party (PAN), which opposed the law, said it was an "attack against the family, which is society's natural group and is formed by a man and a woman." Other than that, the PCS drew little opposition. Bishop Raúl Vera, who headed the Roman Catholic Diocese of Saltillo, declined to condemn the law. While Vera insisted that "two women or two men cannot get married," he also saw gay people as a vulnerable minority. "Today we live in a society that is composed in a different way. There are people who do not want to marry under the law or in the church. They need legal protection. I should not abandon these people." Unlike Mexico City's law, once same-sex couples have registered in Coahuila, the state protects their rights no matter where they live in the country. Twenty days after the law had passed, the country's first same-sex civil union took place in Saltillo. It was between 29-year-olds Karina Almaguer and Karla Lopez, a lesbian couple from Tamaulipas. Between 2007 and 2013, 426 same-sex couples had entered into a PCS, and 36 of them had been annulled.

Same-sex marriage

On 5 March 2013, Congressman Samuel Acevedo Flores from the Social Democratic Party introduced bills to the Congress of Coahuila to legalize same-sex marriages and adoption by same-sex couples. On 11 February 2014, the Congress approved the adoption bill with a vote of 23 in favor and two against; however, debate on same-sex marriage continued. On 8 August 2014, the Congress again began discussions regarding same-sex marriage. The bill passed on 1 September 2014, making Coahuila the second district to reform its Civil Code and the third jurisdiction in Mexico to legalize same-sex marriage after Mexico City and Quintana Roo. The law took effect on 17 September 2014, following Governor Rubén Moreira Valdez's signature. The first couple to marry were Jesus Fernando Covarrubias Monsivais and Luis Alberto Reyes Soto in Saltillo on 20 September. Article 139 of the Family Code now reads:

in Spanish: 
(Marriage is the union of two people who consent to carry out a community of life based on affection, respect, equal treatment and mutual aid, and freely, responsibly, voluntarily and informally take reproductive decisions in accordance with their life project, including the possibility of procreation and adoption.)

Statistics
The following table shows the number of same-sex marriages performed in Coahuila since legalization in 2014 as reported by the National Institute of Statistics and Geography. Data published in August 2018 showed that about half of the same-sex marriages performed in Coahuila involved a partner from another state or country.

Public opinion
A 2017 opinion poll conducted by  found that 44% of Coahuila residents supported same-sex marriage, while 52% were opposed.

According to a 2018 survey by the National Institute of Statistics and Geography, 47% of the Coahuila public opposed same-sex marriage.

See also

 Same-sex marriage in Mexico
 LGBT rights in Mexico
 Same-sex marriage in Mexico City

References

Coahuila
Coahuila
2014 in LGBT history